The 2002 United States Senate election in Tennessee was held on November 5, 2002. Incumbent Republican U.S. Senator Fred Thompson decided to retire. Republican Lamar Alexander won the open seat.

Republican primary

Candidates 
 Lamar Alexander, former U.S. Secretary of Education, former Governor of Tennessee
 Ed Bryant, U.S. Representative
 Mary Taylor-Shelby, perennial candidate
 June Griffin, activist
 Michael Brent Todd
 James E. DuBose
 Christopher G. Fenner

Results

Democratic primary

Candidates 
 Bob Clement, U.S. Representative and candidate for Governor in 1978
 Gary G. Davis, perennial candidate
 Cher A. Hopkey
 Michael L. Hampstead
 Alvin M. Strauss

Results

General election

Campaign
Alexander raised $2 million through June 2002. Clement attacked the Governor for his corporate connections and business dealings. By October, Clement had nearly raised $900,000, while Alexander raised almost $3 million. Bush, who had a 60% approval rating in the state, helped campaign and raise money for Alexander. Alexander was also endorsed by the NRA.

Debates
Complete video of debate, September 30, 2002
Complete video of debate, October 6, 2002
Complete video of debate, October 13, 2002
Complete video of debate, October 20, 2002

Predictions

Polling 

In a September poll from the Knoxville News Sentinel, Alexander was up 45% to 27%. In a DNSC poll during the same month, Alexander was up 49% to 42%. In a mid October Zogby poll had the governor leading 49% to 36%.
A late October WREG-TV poll had Alexander leading 45% to 36%.

Results

See also 
 2002 United States Senate elections

Notes

References 

2002 Tennessee elections
Tennessee
2002